Parathylactus is a genus of longhorn beetles of the subfamily Lamiinae, containing the following species:

 Parathylactus dorsalis (Gahan, 1890)
 Parathylactus sumatranus Breuning & de Jong, 1941

References

Xylorhizini